Anacithara pyrgoformis is a species of sea snails, a marine gastropod mollusc in the family Horaiclavidae.

Description

Distribution
This marine species occurs in the Atlantic Ocean off Rio Grande do Norte, Brazil.

References

 Barros J.C.N., Santana C.A.S. & Lima S.F.B. (2015). Three new species of Anacithara from the Southwestern Atlantic Ocean, Brazil (Mollusca, Neogastropoda, Conoidea, Horaiclavidae). Spixiana. 38(1): 21–28

External links

pyrgoformis
Gastropods described in 2015